Citrus College is a public community college in Glendora, California. The Citrus Community College District, which supports the institution, includes the communities of Azusa, Claremont, Duarte, Glendora and Monrovia. Founded in 1915 by educator Floyd S. Hayden, Citrus College is the oldest community college in Los Angeles County, California, and the fifth oldest in the state of California. Until 1961, the school was operated by the Citrus Union High School District and served the local area as both a high school and a junior college.

The superintendent/president is Dr. Greg Schulz, and the board of trustees includes Cheryl Alexander, Laura J. Bollinger, Dr. Anthony Contreras, Mary Ann Lutz and Dr. Patricia A. Rasmussen.

During the 2019-2020 academic year, Citrus College enrolled 19,626 students. It conferred 2,444 degrees and awarded 2,175 certificates. 531 students graduated with honors (GPAs of 3.3 to 4.0). Citrus College currently offers 65 associate degrees, 88 certificates and skill awards in career technical education programs, and 29 associate degrees for transfer (ADTs). Its operating budget for 2020-2021 is $78 million.

Campus 

Citrus College has a 104-acre (42 ha) campus that includes 44 buildings and seven outdoor athletics facilities.

The Haugh Performing Arts Center (HPAC) is a 1,440-seat proscenium venue and is host to over 140 performances annually, with over 100,000 patrons in attendance.

The campus also holds a larger herbarium.

The campus is also served by a nearby rail station for the Metro L Line as of March 5, 2016.

Athletics 
The college's athletic teams are known as the Owls. The college currently fields eight men's and eight women's varsity teams. It competes as a member of the California Community College Athletic Association (CCCAA) in the Western State Conference (WSC) for all sports except football, which competes in Southern California Football Association (SCFA). The football and soccer team play at the 10,000-seat-capacity Citrus Stadium.

Academics 
The college runs the Citrus Singers program. This program, started in the 1960s, has provided a foundation for students to learn music and perform. Many of its alumni have gone on to be performers on Broadway and Television.

Accreditation 
The college has accreditation from the Western Association of Schools and Colleges (WASC). Its professional memberships include the American Association of Community Colleges (AACC) and the Community College League of California (CCLC).

Notable faculty 
 John Boylan (record producer), Professor of Critical Listening Skills, and Music Business/Audio Careers
 Dale Salwak, Professor of English. Author of numerous books, including Teaching Life, a memoir of over 35 years of teaching.

Notable alumni 
 Carlos Fisher, baseball, Cincinnati Reds pitcher
 Chris Limahelu, football, USC Trojans
 Lionel Manuel, former New York Giants wide receiver who played seven seasons in the NFL, grew up in Rancho Cucamonga.

Free speech lawsuits
In 2003, at California's Citrus College, under the pressure of litigation and FIRE’s national campaign for campus constitutional rights, the Board of Trustees voted to rescind most of the speech codes at the public institution. This was the first victory in FIRE’s declared war on speech codes at public colleges and universities.

The following year, Citrus College was sued again by FIRE when Citrus College reinstated its policy in the early 2010s, when a Young Americans for Liberty chapter, led by Gabriel Nadales and Vincenzo Sinapi-Riddle, was threatened with sanctions for not staying inside the "Free Speech Zone." In an interview to the San Gabriel Valley Tribune, Greg Lukianoff, the president of Foundation for Individual Rights in Education, said, "'Citrus College agreed to eliminate its restrictive ‘free speech zone’ in the face of a FIRE lawsuit back in 2003, but later reinstated its speech quarantine when it thought no one was watching'...'But FIRE was watching, and we'll continue to do so. If the speech codes come back again, so will we.'"

References

External links 
 Official website
 Official athletics website

 
California Community Colleges
Glendora, California
Educational institutions established in 1915
Schools accredited by the Western Association of Schools and Colleges
Universities and colleges in Los Angeles County, California
1915 establishments in California